Hot Country Songs and Country Airplay are charts that rank the top-performing country music songs in the United States, published by Billboard magazine. Hot Country Songs ranks songs based on digital downloads, streaming, and airplay not only from country stations but from stations of all formats, a methodology introduced in 2012. Country Airplay, which began being published in 2012, is based solely on country radio airplay, a methodology that had previously been used from 1990 to 2012 for Hot Country Songs.

Both charts began the year with songs at number one that had been in the top spot in the last chart of 2019; "10,000 Hours" by Dan + Shay and Justin Bieber holding the top spot on the Hot Country Songs chart, and "Even Though I'm Leaving" by Luke Combs atop the Country Airplay chart.  Having spent the last 11 weeks of 2019 at number one on Hot Country Songs, "10,000 Hours" went on to spend its 15th consecutive week in the top spot in the issue of Billboard dated January 25, and in the same week topped the Country Airplay listing for the first time.  The song remained at number one on Hot Country Songs until March 14, when it was displaced by "The Bones" by Maren Morris.  It was the first number one on the chart for Morris and made her the first female artist to top the chart without an accompanying male act since Kelsea Ballerini with "Peter Pan" in September 2016. In May, "The Bones" spent its 11th week at number one on Hot Country Songs, surpassing Taylor Swift's "We Are Never Ever Getting Back Together" as the longest-lasting number one by a solo female artist on that chart.  The song ultimately spent 19 weeks at number one.

When Jimmie Allen's "Make Me Want To" reached number one in its 58th chart week on the Country Airplay chart dated March 7, it set two records: the slowest climb to number one in that chart's history, as well as the longest chart run.  In June, Travis Denning set a new mark for the longest time taken to reach the top spot when "After a Few" reached number one in its 65th week.  Denning was one of a number of acts who achieved their first career number ones in 2020, along with former American Idol finalist Gabby Barrett, whose debut single "I Hope" spent one week at number one on Country Airplay in April.  The song spent 21 non-consecutive weeks in the peak position on Hot Country Songs beginning in July, surpassing the new record set by Morris earlier in the year for the longest-running number one by a solo female artist.  The song achieved exceptional levels of success on streaming platforms for a country song, boosted by a remix featuring pop singer Charlie Puth. Pop singer Gwen Stefani scored her first two number one singles on the Country Airplay chart with "Nobody but You" and "Happy Anywhere", both of which were collaborations with her boyfriend (later fiancé) Blake Shelton.  Other first-time chart toppers included Jameson Rodgers with his debut single "Some Girls", Hardy with "One Beer", which was also the first number one for featured vocalist Devin Dawson, and Parker McCollum with "Pretty Heart", which ended the year at number one.  The longest-lasting number one on the Country Airplay chart was Luke Combs's "Lovin' on You", which spent four weeks at number one in September.  Combs spent a total of seven weeks at number one during the year and had three chart-topping songs, both more than any other act.  Jon Pardi, Sam Hunt, Luke Bryan, Blake Shelton, Gwen Stefani, Morgan Wallen, and Lee Brice each reached the top with two different songs.

Chart history

See also
2020 in music
List of artists who reached number one on the U.S. country chart
List of Billboard number-one country albums of 2020

References

2020
Number-one country singles
United States Country Singles